Libelloides coccajus, the "owly sulphur", is an owlfly species belonging to the family Ascalaphidae, subfamily Ascalaphinae.

Distribution
This rare insect is present in France, Czech Republic, Germany, Italy, Spain and  Switzerland.

Habitat
They have been sighted at elevations of up to 1800m on the French/Italian border in the high Susa Valley

Description
The body is black and quite hairy. The eyes are large and bulging; the antennae are long and clubbed. The wings do not have scales and are partly transparent, with bright yellow areas in the first third, dark brown on the external side. An elongated black area is present towards the end of the posterior edge of the wing. The venation is black. The wings are held spread at rest, as in dragonflies. This species is rather similar to Libelloides lacteus.

Taxonomy
The Libelloides italicus  type in the University of Copenhagen Zoological Museum,  does not correspond to any endemic species of Ascalaphidae living exclusively in the Italian peninsula and it is now considered  to be a junior synonym of Libelloides coccajus.

Biology
Adults can be encountered from April through July.  They are diurnal predators of other flying insects. Eggs are laid in groups on stems of herbaceous plants. Larvae are fearsome predators too. They lie on the soil surface waiting for prey. They live for about two years.

Gallery

References

Neuroptera of Europe
Ascalaphidae
Insects described in 1775
Libelloides